Korsun Shevtshenkovsky (Cyrillic: Корсүнь Шевченковкий) was a  cargo ship that was built in 1943 as Wilhelmshafen by Duivendijks Scheepwerke, Lekkerkerk, Netherlands for Hamburg Amerikanische Packetfahrt AG. She was seized by the British in 1945, passed to the Ministry of War Transport (MoWT) and renamed Empire Douglas. She was transferred to the Soviet Government in 1946 and renamed Korsun Shevtshenkovsky, serving until 1972 when she was scrapped.

Description
The ship was built in 1943 by Duivendijks Scheepwerke, Lekkerkerk.

The ship was propelled by a triple expansion steam engine.

History
Wilhelmshafen was built for Hamburg Amerikanische Packetfahrt AG, Hamburg. She was launched in 1943. In 1945, she was seized by the British at Kiel. She was transferred to the MoWT and renamed Empire Douglas. The United Kingdom Official Number 180738 and Code Letters GNDJ were allocated. Her port of registry was changed to London.

In February 1946, Empire Douglas was transferred to the Soviet Union under the Potsdam Agreement. She was renamed Korsun Shevtshenkovsky (Корсүнь Шевченковкий). Her port of registry was Tallinn. She served until 1972, when she was scrapped at Ghent, Belgium.

References

1943 ships
Ships built in the Netherlands
Steamships of Germany
World War II merchant ships of Germany
Empire ships
Ministry of War Transport ships
Steamships of the United Kingdom
Merchant ships of the United Kingdom
Steamships of the Soviet Union
Merchant ships of the Soviet Union